Rhegminornis calobates is an extinct species of turkey from the early Miocene of Florida. It was described by Alexander Wetmore in 1943.

References

Miocene birds
Tetraonini
Miocene birds of North America
Fossil taxa described in 1943
Taxa named by Alexander Wetmore